Emil Richli (24 October 1904 – 13 May 1934) was a Swiss cyclist. He competed in the team pursuit at the 1924 Summer Olympics.

References

External links
 

1904 births
1934 deaths
Swiss male cyclists
Olympic cyclists of Switzerland
Cyclists at the 1924 Summer Olympics
Cyclists from Zürich